The 2000 CFL season is considered to be the 47th season in modern-day Canadian football, although it is officially the 43rd Canadian Football League season.

CFL News in 2000
The CFL ends the 20th century on a continued upward curve.

After the 1999 season, league attendance levels and television ratings continued to grow. Attendance around the league had an increase of 5.6%, which went over '98 season figures as 1,718,312 fans filled their teams' stadium. Meanwhile, TSN's television ratings also increased by 17.9% over their '98 season ratings. In 2000, CFL attendance and TSN television ratings continued to increase further going over the '99 season figures.

Both, acting Commissioner & Chairman, John Tory and President & COO, Jeff Giles resigned from their respective posts. On Wednesday, November 1, Michael Lysko was named as the tenth CFL Commissioner in league history.

Calgary hosted the Grey Cup game and was successful in their week-long festival to celebrate the 88th championship season. The Grey Cup game, itself ended with another classic finish as the BC Lions spoiled the Montreal Alouettes two-point convert attempt to hang on and win the Grey Cup, 28–26. Immediately following the game, BC Lions legendary kicker Lui Passaglia, who kicked the winning points, retired after 25 seasons.

Regular season standings
Note: GP = Games Played, W = Wins, L = Losses, T = Ties, OTL = Overtime losses, PF = Points For, PA = Points Against, Pts = Points

Bold text means that they have clinched the playoffs.
Teams losing in overtime are awarded one point.
Calgary and Montreal both have first round byes.

Grey Cup playoffs

The BC Lions are the 2000 Grey Cup Champions, defeating the Montreal Alouettes 28–26, at Calgary's McMahon Stadium.  The Lions became the first team with a losing record (8–10, 1 OTL) to win the Grey Cup. The Lions' Robert Drummond (RB) was named the Grey Cup's Most Valuable Player and Sean Millington (FB) was the Grey Cup's Most Valuable Canadian.

Playoff bracket

CFL Leaders
 CFL Passing Leaders
 CFL Rushing Leaders
 CFL Receiving Leaders

2000 CFL All-Stars

Offence
QB – Dave Dickenson, Calgary Stampeders
RB – Sean Millington, BC Lions
RB – Mike Pringle, Montreal Alouettes
SB – Derrell Mitchell, Toronto Argonauts
SB – Milt Stegall, Winnipeg Blue Bombers
WR – Curtis Marsh, Saskatchewan Roughriders
WR – Travis Moore, Calgary Stampeders
C – Bryan Chiu, Montreal Alouettes
OG – Andrew Greene, Saskatchewan Roughriders
OG – Pierre Vercheval, Montreal Alouettes
OT – Chris Perez, BC Lions
OT – Bruce Beaton, Edmonton Eskimos

Defence
DT – Demetrious Maxie, Saskatchewan Roughriders
DT – Joe Fleming, Calgary Stampeders
DE – Shonte Peoples, Calgary Stampeders
DE – Joe Montford, Hamilton Tiger-Cats
LB – George White, Saskatchewan Roughriders
LB – Terry Ray, Edmonton Eskimos
LB – Alondra Johnson, Calgary Stampeders
CB – Marvin Coleman, Calgary Stampeders
CB – Davis Sanchez, Montreal Alouettes
DB – Eddie Davis, Calgary Stampeders
DB – Barron Miles, Montreal Alouettes
DS – Greg Frers, Calgary Stampeders

Special teams
P – Noel Prefontaine, Toronto Argonauts
K – Lui Passaglia, BC Lions
ST – Albert Johnson III, Winnipeg Blue Bombers

2000 Western All-Stars

Offence
QB – Dave Dickenson, Calgary Stampeders
RB – Sean Millington, BC Lions
RB – Kelvin Anderson, Calgary Stampeders
SB – Terry Vaughn, Edmonton Eskimos
SB – Alfred Jackson, BC Lions
WR – Curtis Marsh, Saskatchewan Roughriders
WR – Travis Moore, Calgary Stampeders
C – Leo Groenewegen, Edmonton Eskimos
OG – Andrew Greene, Saskatchewan Roughriders
OG – Fred Childress, Calgary Stampeders
OT – Chris Perez, BC Lions
OT – Bruce Beaton, Edmonton Eskimos

Defence
DT – Demetrious Maxie, Saskatchewan Roughriders
DT – Joe Fleming, Calgary Stampeders
DE – Shonte Peoples, Calgary Stampeders
DE – Herman Smith, BC Lions
LB – George White, Saskatchewan Roughriders
LB – Terry Ray, Edmonton Eskimos
LB – Alondra Johnson, Calgary Stampeders
CB – Marvin Coleman, Calgary Stampeders
CB – Eric Carter, BC Lions
DB – Eddie Davis, Calgary Stampeders
DB – Ralph Staten, Edmonton Eskimos
DS – Greg Frers, Calgary Stampeders

Special teams
P – Tony Martino, Calgary Stampeders
K – Lui Passaglia, BC Lions
ST – Marvin Coleman, Calgary Stampeders

2000 Eastern All-Stars

Offence
QB – Anthony Calvillo, Montreal Alouettes
RB – Ronald Williams, Hamilton Tiger-Cats
RB – Mike Pringle, Montreal Alouettes
SB – Derrell Mitchell, Toronto Argonauts
SB – Milt Stegall, Winnipeg Blue Bombers
WR – Ben Cahoon, Montreal Alouettes
WR – Robert Gordon, Winnipeg Blue Bombers
C – Bryan Chiu, Montreal Alouettes
OG – Chris Burns, Hamilton Tiger-Cats
OG – Pierre Vercheval, Montreal Alouettes
OT – Dave Hack, Hamilton Tiger-Cats
OT – Moe Elewonibi, Winnipeg Blue Bombers

Defence
DT – Johnny Scott, Toronto Argonauts
DT – Mike Philbrick, Hamilton Tiger-Cats
DE – Swift Burch, Montreal Alouettes
DE – Joe Montford, Hamilton Tiger-Cats
LB – Mike O'Shea, Toronto Argonauts
LB – Calvin Tiggle, Toronto Argonauts
LB – Antonio Armstrong, Winnipeg Blue Bombers
CB – Irvin Smith, Montreal Alouettes
CB – Davis Sanchez, Montreal Alouettes
DB – Chris Shelling, Hamilton Tiger-Cats
DB – Barron Miles, Montreal Alouettes
DS – Lester Smith, Montreal Alouettes

Special teams
P – Noel Prefontaine, Toronto Argonauts
K – Paul Osbaldiston, Hamilton Tiger-Cats
ST – Albert Johnson III, Winnipeg Blue Bombers

2000 Intergold CFLPA All-Stars

Offence
QB – Dave Dickenson, Calgary Stampeders
OT – Moe Elewonibi, Winnipeg Blue Bombers
OT – Chris Perez, BC Lions
OG – Fred Childress, Calgary Stampeders
OG – Andrew Greene, Saskatchewan Roughriders
C – Carl Coulter, Hamilton Tiger-Cats
RB – Mike Pringle, Montreal Alouettes
FB – Sean Millington, BC Lions
SB – Kez McCorvey, Edmonton Eskimos
SB – Derrell Mitchell, Toronto Argonauts
WR – Curtis Marsh, Saskatchewan Roughriders
WR – Milt Stegall, Winnipeg Blue Bombers

Defence
DE – Joe Montford, Hamilton Tiger-Cats
DE – Herman Smith, BC Lions
DT – Johnny Scott, Toronto Argonauts
DT – Joe Fleming, Calgary Stampeders
LB – Darryl Hall, Calgary Stampeders
LB – Alondra Johnson, Calgary Stampeders
LB – Terry Ray, Edmonton Eskimos
CB – Juran Bolden, Winnipeg Blue Bombers
CB – Davis Sanchez, Montreal Alouettes
HB – Jackie Kellogg, Calgary Stampeders
HB – Barron Miles, Montreal Alouettes
S – Greg Frers, Calgary Stampeders

Special teams
K – Lui Passaglia, BC Lions
P – Noel Prefontaine, Toronto Argonauts
ST – Albert Johnson III, Winnipeg Blue Bombers

Head coach
 Charlie Taaffe, Montreal Alouettes

2000 CFL Awards
CFL's Most Outstanding Player Award – Dave Dickenson (QB), Calgary Stampeders
CFL's Most Outstanding Canadian Award – Sean Millington (RB), BC Lions
CFL's Most Outstanding Defensive Player Award – Joe Montford (DE), Hamilton Tiger-Cats
CFL's Most Outstanding Offensive Lineman Award – Pierre Vercheval (OG), Montreal Alouettes
CFL's Most Outstanding Rookie Award – Albert Johnson III (WR), Winnipeg Blue Bombers
CFL's Most Outstanding Special Teams Award – Albert Johnson III (WR), Winnipeg Blue Bombers
CFLPA's Outstanding Community Service Award – Mike Morreale (SB), Hamilton Tiger-Cats
CFL's Coach of the Year – Charlie Taaffe, Montreal Alouettes
Commissioner's Award - Jeff Giles, Toronto

References

2000
2000 in Canadian football